McMichael may refer to:

 McMichael (surname), list of people with this name
 McMichael Creek, a tributary of Pocono Creek in Pennsylvania
 McMichael Limited, a British manufacturer of radios and televisions
 McMichael, Pennsylvania, a community

See also
Mick Michael (1922-2016), Australian politician
Mick Michael (philatelist)